Danilo Marcelino (born 8 March 1966) is a former professional tennis player from Brazil.

Career
Marcelino entered the singles draw of a Grand Slam on four occasions but only once progressed past the opening round, which was at the 1989 Australian Open, defeating Jan Apell in five sets. In the second round he was eliminated in straight sets by Mark Woodforde. He had more success in the men's doubles, with a best showing coming at the 1990 US Open, where he and countryman Nelson Aerts made the third round. En route they defeated number one seeds Rick Leach and Jim Pugh.

On the ATP Tour he made his only final at the 1989 Italian Open, with double's partner Mauro Menezes. His best singles achievements include reaching the semi finals of the Guarujá Open in 1988 and 1989, making the semi finals at São Paulo in 1990 and the semi finals at Brasilia the following year. He claimed some of the biggest scalps of his career in 1991, when he twice beat a player ranked 20 in the world, Brad Gilbert in the Volvo International and Derrick Rostagno at the Sydney Indoor Championships.

He also played some Davis Cup tennis for Brazil. In singles he lost both his matches but he won one of his two doubles rubbers. That win came in Brazil's Americas Zone relegation play-off against the Chile Davis Cup team. Partnering Mauro Menezes, the pairing defeated Cristián Araya and Pedro Rebolledo to help Brazil win the tie 4–1.

Grand Prix career finals

Doubles: 1 (0–1)

Challenger titles

Singles: (3)

Doubles: (6)

References

1966 births
Living people
Brazilian male tennis players
Sportspeople from Salvador, Bahia
20th-century Brazilian people
21st-century Brazilian people